A list of Western films released from 1955 to 1959.

TV series of 1950s

see, List of TV Westerns

1955
Western